Adnan Mufti (born 30 December 1984) is a Pakistani-born cricketer who played for the United Arab Emirates national cricket team. He played 46 first-class and 19 List A matches between 2007 and 2016 in Pakistan. In December 2016 he was named in the United Arab Emirates squad for their Twenty20 International (T20I) series against Afghanistan. He made his One Day International (ODI) debut for the United Arab Emirates against Scotland on 24 January 2017 and was awarded the man of the match. He made his T20I debut for the United Arab Emirates against Papua New Guinea on 14 April 2017.

In September 2017, he scored his maiden century in first-class cricket, when he made 110 for the United Arab Emirates against Namibia in the 2015–17 ICC Intercontinental Cup. In December 2017, he scored his first century in List A cricket, when he made 104 for the United Arab Emirates against Nepal in the 2015–17 ICC World Cricket League Championship.

In January 2018, he was named in the United Arab Emirates' squad for the 2018 ICC World Cricket League Division Two tournament. In August 2018, he was named in the United Arab Emirates' squad for the 2018 Asia Cup Qualifier tournament.

References

External links
 

1984 births
Living people
Emirati cricketers
United Arab Emirates One Day International cricketers
United Arab Emirates Twenty20 International cricketers
Pakistani cricketers
Rawalpindi cricketers
People from Gujrat District
Pakistani emigrants to the United Arab Emirates
Pakistani expatriate sportspeople in the United Arab Emirates